Epilobium billardierianum, commonly known as the glabrous willow herb or smooth willow herb, is a species in the family Onagraceae that is native to Australia and New Zealand.

The species is found in the South West, Great Southern and Goldfields-Esperance regions of Western Australia.

References

billardierianum
Plants described in 1828
Rosids of Western Australia